"Love Is Alive" is a song by Gary Wright taken from the 1975 album The Dream Weaver. It features Wright on vocals and keyboards and Andy Newmark on drums, with all music except for the drums produced on the keyboards. The album's title cut and "Love Is Alive" both peaked at No. 2 on the Billboard Hot 100 singles chart. "Love Is Alive" spent 27 weeks on the chart, seven weeks longer than "Dream Weaver".  Billboard ranked "Love Is Alive" as the No. 9 song of 1976.

In the US, "Love Is Alive" peaked at number two on the Hot 100. "Kiss and Say Goodbye" by The Manhattans and "Don't Go Breaking My Heart" by Elton John and Kiki Dee kept it from the number one spot.  In Canada, the song reached No. 6.

Chart performance

Weekly charts

Year-end charts

Covers and samples
Olivia Newton-John covered the track on her first live album, Love Performance in 1976. She performed the song on her first 1976 ABC-TV special and on a 1977 BBC special.  Her rendition was also included as a bonus track on the 2010 Japanese re-issue of her album Totally Hot.
In 1984, Chaka Khan covered the song under the title "My Love Is Alive" on her album I Feel For You.  
In 1991, Joe Cocker covered "Love Is Alive" on his Night Calls LP. Released as a single, it reached number 72 in Canada and number 7 on the U.S. Mainstream Rock chart in the summer of 1992.
In 1997, dance act 3rd Party recorded the song for their debut album Alive which charted on the Billboard Hot 100. This version peaked at number 19 on the US Billboard Hot Dance Music chart.
Later covers of "Love Is Alive" include those by Céline Dion, Anastacia, Joan Osborne, Vonda Shepard, Richie Havens, Big Sugar and Táta Vega.
Love Is Alive has frequently been sampled, primarily in the hip hop genre.

References

External links
 
 

1975 songs
1976 singles
Gary Wright songs
Songs written by Gary Wright
Joe Cocker songs
Susan Ashton songs
Warner Records singles